İhtiras Fırtınası is a 1983 Turkish romantic drama film, directed by Halit Refiğ and starring Gülsen Bubikoglu, Cihan Ünal, and Zuhal Olcay.

Cast
 Gülsen Bubikoglu as Seref
 Cihan Ünal as Feyyaz
 Zuhal Olcay (credited as Zühal Olcay) as Müjgan 
 Raik Alniaçik as Hasim
 Haluk Kurtoglu as Recai Bey
 Diler Saraç as Recai Bey'in Karisi
 Renan Fosforoglu as Doktor
 Necip Tekçe as General
 Ihsan Gedik as Hasim'in Adami
Others
 Mary March	
 Damla Ira	
 Muhtesem Durukan		
 Zeki Alpan	
 Eren Erenci
 Cevdet Balikçi

References

External links
İhtiras Fırtınası at the Internet Movie Database

1983 films
Turkish romantic drama films
1983 romantic drama films
Films directed by Halit Refiğ
Turkish LGBT-related films
1980s Turkish-language films